Kersley is a small, unincorporated rural community located just south of Quesnel in British Columbia, Canada. Kersley is situated along highway 97 in a micro-climate area that also includes the nearby communities of Alexandria, Mcleese lake, and Soda Creek. Kersley is home to Sisters Creek park, a recreational walking/equestrian trail along the banks of the Fraser River. The community of Kersley has a cold weather ice arena, public park, tennis courts, baseball diamond, and volunteer fire department.

Climate
Kersley has a humid continental climate (Köppen Dfb) with mild summers and cold winters. In spite of winters being cold, Kersley is mild for its latitude in North America due to some Pacific moderation. The climate is relatively dry, being in a rain shadow of the coastal mountains, but in spite of this snowfall is quite high.

See also
Alexandria
Australian

References

Unincorporated settlements in British Columbia
Geography of the Cariboo
Populated places in the Cariboo Regional District
Designated places in British Columbia